The 2019–20 season of the Scottish Basketball Championship Women, the national women's basketball league of Scotland.

Format
In Division 1, each team plays each other twice, once home, once away, for a total of 16 games.

Results

Regular season

Scottish Cup

1st Round

Quarter-finals

Semi-finals

Final

References

basketball
basketball